Johnson's Addition is a hamlet in southern Alberta, Canada within the Municipal District of Taber. It is adjacent to the western boundary of the Town of Taber at the intersection of Highway 3 and Highway 864 (Range Road 170).

Demographics 

The Municipal District of Taber's 2016 municipal census counted a population of 130 in Johnson's Addition, a  change from the hamlet's 2013 municipal census population of 115.

See also 
List of communities in Alberta
List of designated places in Alberta
List of hamlets in Alberta

References 

Hamlets in Alberta
Designated places in Alberta
Municipal District of Taber